The communauté de communes de Bénévent-Grand-Bourg  was created on December 17, 1991 and is located in the Creuse département of the Nouvelle-Aquitaine region, in central France. It was merged into the new Communauté de communes Monts et Vallées Ouest Creuse in January 2017, but this merger was revoked and the former communautés de communes were recreated on 31 December 2019. Its seat is Le Grand-Bourg. Its area is 389.4 km2. Its population was 6,924 in 2018.

It comprises the following 16 communes:

Arrènes
Augères
Aulon
Azat-Châtenet
Bénévent-l'Abbaye
Ceyroux
Chamborand
Châtelus-le-Marcheix
Fleurat
Fursac
Le Grand-Bourg
Lizières
Marsac
Mourioux-Vieilleville
Saint-Goussaud
Saint-Priest-la-Plaine

See also
Communes of the Creuse department

References 

Benevent-Grand-Bourg
Benevent-Grand-Bourg